Axel Encinas (born 24 May 2004) is an Argentine footballer who is an attacking midfielder at Club Atletico River Plate and plays for the Argentina national under-20 football team.

Early life
From the San Jorge neighborhood, in Don Torcuato, the same area as Argentine professional footballer Juan Román Riquelme heralded from. He played at the San Calal club, in Sordeaux, near Don Torcuato before joining the youth system at River Plate, for whom he played as a winger and a striker before settling into a number 10 role. He impressed enough to begin training with the first team occasionally from his mid-teens where he received advice and coaching from Marcelo Gallardo. He has a reputation for possessing good ball control.

Career
In June 2020 he agreed his first professional contract with River Plate, signing a three-year contract. Encinas signed a new contract with River Plate in January 2023 keeping him at the club until 2025.

Personal life
Nicknamed ‘El Gordo’, the same as Argentine World Cup winner Enzo Fernández.

International career
He was named in the Argentina under-20 squad by Javier Mascherano for the 2023 South American U-20 Championship held in Colombia in January and February 2023.

References

2004 births
Living people
Argentine footballers
Sportspeople from Buenos Aires Province
Association football midfielders
Argentina youth international footballers